Cannabis in Congo may refer to:

 Cannabis in the Democratic Republic of the Congo
 Cannabis in the Republic of the Congo